The Valley of the Gods is a scenic sandstone valley near Mexican Hat in San Juan County, southeastern Utah, United States. Part of Bears Ears National Monument, the Valley of the Gods is located north of Monument Valley across the San Juan River and has rock formations similar to those in Monument Valley with tall, reddish brown mesas, buttes, towers and mushroom rocks, remnants of an ancient landscape.  On December 4, 2017, President Donald Trump issued a proclamation that reduced the area of Bears Ears National Monument, proclaimed by President Barack Obama on December 28, 2016, with new monument boundaries that exclude the Valley of the Gods. The area remains protected public land administered as an Area of Critical Environmental Concern and managed by the Bureau of Land Management, as it was before the monument designation.

Overview
The Valley of the Gods may be toured via a  gravel road (San Juan County Road 242) that winds around the formations. The road is rather steep and bumpy in parts but is passable by non-four-wheel drive vehicles in dry weather. The western end joins Utah State Route 261 shortly before its  ascent up Cedar Mesa at Moki Dugway, while the eastern end starts  from the town of Mexican Hat along U.S. Route 163 and heads north, initially crossing flat, open land and following the course of Lime Creek, a seasonal wash, before turning west toward the buttes and pinnacles. In addition to the gravel road, the area is also crisscrossed by off-road dirt trails.

The valley is public land managed by the Bureau of Land Management. No entrance fee is charged and no services are provided in the valley. Dispersed camping is permitted at previously disturbed sites, though campfires are not allowed.

In popular culture
The valley has been used as the backdrop for various movies, commercials and television shows including:
 Several Western movies 
 In the Airwolf (1984–1986) television series, the titular helicopter Airwolf lair is located in the valley (although actually filming was done in Monument Valley).
 In 2011, two episodes of the Doctor Who TV show: "The Impossible Astronaut" and "Day of the Moon", the second of which includes an explicit on-screen reference to the filming location.
 The valley is the titular location in Lech Majewski's 2019 film of the same name.

References

External links 

Official BLM site
Valley of the Gods on American Southwest net

Colorado Plateau
Landforms of San Juan County, Utah
Rock formations of Utah
Tourist attractions in San Juan County, Utah
Valleys of Utah